is a city located in Saitama Prefecture, Japan. , the city had an estimated population of 142,835 in 65,950 households and a population density of 4700 persons per km².

Geography
Misato is located in the extreme southeastern corner Saitama Prefecture. The Edogawa River runs along the eastern border of the city, the Naka River runs along the western border, and the Oba River runs through the central part of the city. Located in the middle of the Kantō Plain, the land is generally flat, with the highest point being about 8 meters above sea level. The city is approximately 20 kilometers from downtown Tokyo.

Surrounding municipalities
Saitama Prefecture
 Yoshikawa
 Sōka
 Yashio
Tokyo Metropolis
 Katsushika-ku
Chiba Prefecture
 Nagareyama
 Matsudo

Climate
Misato has a humid subtropical climate (Köppen Cfa) characterized by warm summers and cool winters with light to no snowfall.  The average annual temperature in Misato is 15.1 °C. The average annual rainfall is 1387 mm with September as the wettest month. The temperatures are highest on average in August, at around 26.9 °C, and lowest in January, at around 4.4 °C.

Demographics
Per Japanese census data, the population of Misato expanded rapidly in the late 20th century and has grown at a slower pace in the 21st.

History
The area of modern Misato was originally part of Shimōsa Province, and was transferred to Musashi Province in 1683. The villages of Hikonari, Waseda, Togasaki and Yagisato were created within Kitakatsushika District, Saitama with the establishment of the modern municipalities system on April 1, 1889. Togasaki and Yagisato merged on July 1, 1933 to form the village of Towa.  On September 30, 1956, Hikonari, Waseda and Towa merged to form the village of Misato, which was raised to town status on October 1, 1964. The area experienced rapid population growth in the 1960s and 1970s with the large-scale construction of public housing new town developments.

Misato was elevated to city status on May 3, 1972.

Government
Misato has a mayor-council form of government with a directly elected mayor and a unicameral city council of 22 members. Misato contributes two members to the Saitama Prefectural Assembly. In terms of national politics, the city is part of Saitama 14th district of the lower house of the Diet of Japan.

Economy
Due to this location, Misato is primarily a bedroom community with a significant percentage of its population commuting to the Tokyo metropolis for work.

Education
Misato has 19 public elementary schools and eight public middle schools operated by the city government and three public high schools (Misato North High School, Misato Technical High School, Misato High School) operated by the Saitama Prefectural Board of Education, The prefecture also operates one special education school for the handicapped.

Transportation

Railway
 JR East – Musashino Line
 -  
  Metropolitan Intercity Railway Company - Tsukuba Express

Highway
  Shuto Expressway  Misato Route

Noted people from Misato
Yūya Uchida, voice actress
Mika Kikuchi, actress 
Mayu Watanabe, retired actress,singer,model etc 
Shunketsu Yūji, sumo wrestler
Tomoyuki Sakai, professional soccer player
Junko Furuta, murder victim

References

External links

Official Website 

Cities in Saitama Prefecture
Misato, Saitama (city)